RACE program (Research and Development in Advanced Communications Technologies in Europe) was a program launched in 1980s by the Commission of European Communities to pave the way towards commercial use of Integrated Broadband Communication (IBC) in Europe in late 1990s.

References

Research projects